"Viva Las Vengeance" is a song by Panic! at the Disco, released on June 1, 2022, as the lead single from their final album Viva Las Vengeance. It was written by Brendon Urie, Jake Sinclair, and Mike Viola, and produced by Butch Walker, Sinclair, and Viola. The song was announced on May 29, 2022, and released alongside its music video.

Reception
Jon Blistein of Rolling Stone described the track as a "stomping blast of power-pop with frontman Brendon Urie bellowing against a background of lush, Queen-esque harmonies".

Music video
The music video was released on June 1, 2022, and directed by Brendan Walter. The video involves the whole band performing on an Ed Sullivan Show-esque late-night talk show. While Urie is performing, he suffers several painful injuries but continues singing, even as his piano eats him alive. After the last line, the video cuts to an exhausted, but unharmed Urie seated at his piano, relieved that his injuries were some sort of hallucination, until he finds a single drop of blood on the piano keys.

Personnel 
Credits adapted from Tidal.

Musicians
Brendon Urie – vocals, guitar, synthesizer, piano, harpsichord, drums
Jake Sinclair – bass, guitar, synthesizer, organ, backing vocals
Mike Viola – guitar, synthesizer, organ, harpsichord, backing vocals

Technical
Butch Walker – producer
Jake Sinclair – producer
Mike Viola – producer
Johnny Morgan – additional producer
Rouble Kapoor – additional producer
Bernie Grundman – mastering
Claudius Mittendorfer – mixing, recording
Rachel White – recording

Charts

Release history

References

2022 songs
2022 singles
American power pop songs
Panic! at the Disco songs
Songs about revenge
Songs about Las Vegas
Songs written by Brendon Urie